Charge is the fourth solo album by singer-songwriter David Ford, released on March 18, 2013.

Track listing
All songs written by David Ford.

 Pour a Little Poison
 The Ballad of Miss Lily
 Isn't It Strange?
 Let It Burn
 Philadelphia Boy
 Moving On
 What's Not to Love?
 Perfect Soul
 Throwaway
 Every Time

References

2013 albums
David Ford (musician) albums